Manopad or Manopadu is a Mandal in Jogulamba Gadwal district, Telangana.

Villages
The villages in Manopadu Mandal include:

 A. Burdipadu 	
 Amaravai 	
 Bonkuru 	
 Boravelli
 Chandrashekar Nagar 	
 Chennipadu 	
 Chinnaamudyalapadu 	
 Chinnapothulapadu
 Gokulapadu 	
 Paipadu
 Itikyalapadu 	
 Jallapuram 	
 Kalugotla 	
 Kalukuntla 	
 Kanchupadu 	
 Korvipadu 	
 Madduru
 Manopadu 	
 Mennipadu 	
 Narayanapur 	
 Pallepadu 	
 Peddaamudyalapadu 	
 Peddapothulapadu 	
 Pulluru 	
 Undavelly

References

 
Mandals in Jogulamba Gadwal district
Jogulamba Gadwal district